Parbona Ami Chartey Tokey (English: I can not leave you) is a 2015 Bengali romantic comedy film directed by Raj Chakraborty and produced by Shree Venkatesh Films and Surinder Films. This film is a remake of Telugu film named Uyyala Jampala released in 2013. The film illustrates love story and family drama – with Bonny Sengupta and newcomer Koushani Mukherjee playing the lead characters. The film's music is by Indradeep Dasgupta.

Plot

The whole film is narrated Shibu who is running back to confess his love to Apu. Shibu and Apu quarrel since their childhood which starts from the time of the latter's birth itself. Apu is the daughter of the friend of Bonny's father. Apu's family and his parents live in a mansion while Shibu and his widowed mother live in a small house exactly beside the mansion in a modernized yet naturally scenic village.

Cast 
 Bonny Sengupta as Shibnath a.k.a. Shibu
 Koushani Mukherjee as Aparna Roy a.k.a. Apu
 Swastika Dutta as Apu's friend
 Kharaj Mukherjee as Apu's father
Mainak Banerjee as Apu's fake boyfriend
 Tulika Basu as Shibu's mother
Debomoy Mukherjee as Shibu's friend
 Moushumi Saha as Apu's mother
Pinky Mallik as Apu's housemaid
Chhanda Karanjee as Apu's grandmother 
 Sourav Chatterjee as Apu's fiancé

Soundtrack

References

External links
 

Bengali-language Indian films
2010s Bengali-language films
2015 films
Indian romantic comedy-drama films
Bengali remakes of Telugu films
Films directed by Raj Chakraborty
Films scored by Indradeep Dasgupta
2015 romantic comedy-drama films